The 2014–15 Penn State Nittany Lions basketball team represented Pennsylvania State University. Head coach Pat Chambers coached his fourth season with the team. The team played its home games in University Park, Pennsylvania, US at the Bryce Jordan Center and were a member of the Big Ten Conference.

The Nittany Lions finished their non-conference portion of the season at 12-1. The 12 wins set a school record for most non-conference victories, as well as their best overall start since the 1995-96 team jumped to a 13-0 record.

Previous season
The 2013–14 Penn State Nittany Lions finished the season with an overall record of 16–18, with a record of 6–12 in the Big Ten regular season for a three way tie to finish in tenth place. In the 2014 Big Ten tournament, the Nittany Lions were defeated by Minnesota, 63–56 in the first round. They were invited to the 2014 College Basketball Invitational, in which they defeated Hampton in the first round before losing to Siena in quarterfinals.

Off season

Departures

Incoming transfers

Incoming recruits

Personnel

Roster

Coaching Staff

Schedule and results

|-
!colspan=9 style="background:#1C3C6B; color:white;"|  Non-conference regular season

|-
!colspan=9 style="background:#1C3C6B; color:white;"|  Big Ten regular season

|-
!colspan=9 style="background:#1C3C6B; color:white;"|  Big Ten tournament

Source -

See also
2014–15 Penn State Lady Lions basketball team

References

Penn State Nittany Lions basketball seasons
Penn State